Nizami Street is a large pedestrian and shopping street in downtown Baku, Azerbaijan, named after classical Persian poet Nizami Ganjavi.

Overview
The street's history could be traced back to Baku's town-planning project of 1864. The street runs through the city's downtown from west to east. It begins from Abdulla Shaig Street, in the mountainous part of the city and ends at railroad bed on Sabit Orujov Street, near a monument to Shah Ismail Khatai in “Black City”. The total length of the street is 3,538 m.

The traffic-free segment, which begins at the Fountains Square and ends at the Rashid Behbudov Street, is commonly known as Torgovaya ("the merchant street" in Russian).

Nizami Street is home to various outlets, from banks to fashion stores and is one of the most expensive streets in the world. The street also accommodates the embassies of Germany, Norway, the Netherlands and Austria, as well as the European Union Delegation to Azerbaijan. The nearest metro stations are Sahil (red line, south of Nizami Street) and 28 May (both red and green lines, north of the street).

History of the street

In 1859, there was a strong earthquake in Shamakhi, because of which the Shamakhi Governorate was demolished and was created Baku Governorate in the center of Baku. After becoming the governorate, the city occupied a new level of development, appeared a necessity of planned construction of the city, because new governorate institutions began to emerge in the city. In the first years after the order of 1859 was signed, population flow in Baku began to rise. New caravanserais were being constructed in the northern part of fortress walls, each of which occupied a whole quarter, trading rows and stores. Subsequently, this part of the city became the central trading part and it was necessary to develop its construction plan. It was entrusted to Gasim bey Hajibababeyov and group of engineers and architects from Saint Petersburg. According to them, construction of new highways, beginning from Icheri Sheher fortress in all directions, was the main idea of urban planning. All this ideas are reflected in the first governorate urban plan of Baku, created in 1864 by them and called “scrappy” where the street was also projected. Initially it was called “Torgovaya Street”, because it became a trade center due to its location. Later, in 1879 it was officially renamed to “Gubernskaya Street”, but the citizens still called it “Torgovaya”. The street began on Mariinskaya Street (later Korganov Street, now Rasul Rza Street), where reputable multi-storeyed houses of wealthy people were located and reached to so called “Black City” of Baku, where were oil wells and other industrial objects. The late 19th century is characterized with rapid economical development of the city and the second massive flow of the population from other governorates of the Russian Empire, the reason of which was adoption of new oil wells in the Absheron Peninsula. Marine infrastructure was also developed and general plan of fortress vorstadt and marine port was significantly expanded since 1855, and the city turned to a significant trade port of South Russia. Rapid economic growth of Baku was followed by appearance of multiple interlayer of rich industrialists constructing new buildings. A great number of buildings on this street were constructed by the order of oil magnates such as Musa Naghiyev, Shamsi Asadullayev and Murtuza Mukhtarov, and projected by prominent architects of that time such as N.A.von der Nonne, M.Gafar Ismayilov, A.Hajibababeyov, K.B.Surkevich, J.V.Goslavski, Józef Plośko, Zivar bey Ahmadbeyov, E.Edel and G.Termikelov.

In 1868, a building of caravanserai (“Araz” cinema) was built by the project of architect M.Gafar Ismayilov, in deserted territory, which adjoins Nizami Street now. A year later, in 1869, St. Gregory the Illuminator's Church, Baku was built near the caravanserai.

In 1880, two two-storeyed residential houses (Nizami 52 and 54), which bases geometry of the street, one of the main highways of the city, was constructed at the right side of the street, between Prachechnaya and Mariinskaya Streets.

In 1888, a photo-studio of A.Mishon was located on this street, in “Imperial” hotel. And photo-studio of other photographer, David Rostamyan, was located in a two-storeyed mansion on the corner of Torgovaya and Mariinskaya Streets. Numerous small ware's shops, groceries, confectioner's shops and florists, and also the most prestigious hotels of the city – “Bolshaya Moskovskaya”, “Imperial”, “London” and “Severnie nomera” were in this part of the city.

In 1896, a three-storeyed apartment house (Nizami 79) was built on the corner of Prachechnaya Street (later Gogol, now Mardanov Qardashlari Street) by architect I.V.Edel, by the order of oil magnate Murtuza Mukhtarov and in 1910, a new storey was added to it by architect Jozef Ploshko and it obtained a half-circled concept of a façade and a circled concept of a cupola. Millionaire Haji Rajabli's house, now “Vatan” cinema (Nizami 75,77) was constructed on the left side of Torgovaya, between Mariinskaya and Prachechnaya Streets. On the opposite side was a building possessed by Mirza Taghiyev, a merchant from Shamakhi, where was located a popular shop of German confectioner Zeitz.

In 1899, a one-storeyed building of “Baku branch of Russian Imperial technical union” (Nizami 115), where one of the buildings of the Azerbaijan State Oil Academy is located, was built on Millionnaya Street (later Darwin, Voroshilov Streets, now Fikret Amirov Street). A building for the Rothschild brothers, where their office was located, and later, in 1918 and 1920s the consulate of the Netherlands (Nizami 20) was located in this house, was built on the corner of Persidskaya Street (later Polukhina, now Nurtuza Mukhtarov Street) by the project of civil engineer K.B.Surkevich.

In 1902, a two-storeyed residential house was built on the corner of Vokzalnaya Street by the architect I.V.Edel. In the 1960s, the third storey was added to the building.

In 1904, a mill was constructed on the intersection with Vokzalnaya Street (now Pushkin Street), for one of the influential people of that time, millionaire and philanthropist Haji Zeynalabdin Taghiyev.

In 1910, a synagogue building, where the State Theatre of Song named after Rashid Behbudov (Nizami 76) is located, was constructed by the project of architect J.V.Goslavskiy, on the south-eastern intersection of Torgovaya and Kaspiyskaya Streets (later Schmidt, now Rashid Behbudov Streets).

In 1911, an operetta building, where the Azerbaijan State Academic Opera and Ballet Theater is located (Nizami 95), was constructed on the other corner of the crossroads by the order of industrialist Mayilov and by the project of G. Termikelov and N. Bayev. In the same year an apartment house near the building of the operetta (Nizami 93) and a four-storeyed residential house on the corner of Mariinskaya Street (Nizami 48), which is called “Naghiyev’s house” as all other buildings of the oil magnate, were projected and constructed by architect Jozef Ploshko by the order of Musa Naghiyev. This house is considered one of the best creations of Jozef Ploshko. A house, where academician Lev Landau, laureate of the Nobel Prize, was born in 1924, was constructed on the corner of Krasnovodskaya Street (later Krasnoarmeyskaya, now Samad Vurgun Street).

In 1912, on the other side of the crossroad with Mariinskaya Street, a four-storeyed apartment house (Nizami 50) was constructed by the project of architects G.Termikelov and Haji Gasimov, by the order of Taghiyev brothers.

In 1925, the street was renamed to Fizuli Street, in honour of Mahammad Fuzuli – a great Azerbaijani poet of the 16th century, and was called so until 1962, with slight breaks from 1939 to 1940, when the street was renamed to Krasnopresnenskaya Street. Since 1962, the street is called Nizami Street.

In 1932–1934, a complex of buildings of the State Bank of the Azerbaijan SSR (Nizami 87 and 89) was constructed by the project of A.Dubov, on the corner of Torgovaya and Bolshaya Morskaya Streets (later Kirov Avenue, now Bul-Bul Avenue).

In 1949, two magnificent residential houses called “oilmen’s houses” (Nizami 66 and 83), projected by famous architects Mikayil Huseynov and Sadig Dadashov, were built on the other corners of “Landau’s house” crossroad. German captives captivated during the Great patriotic War were used as labor force in construction of these buildings.

In 1952–1954, the following “General development plan of the city for a period from 1976” was developed by creative membership of the State Project Institution. Namely, according to this plan, residential houses were being constructed in the architecture of which are used elements of constructivism, in the territory of the State Bank right up to intersection with Richard Sorge Street.

In 1966, a new “Nasimi” park named after the prominent Azerbaijani poet of the 14th century Imadaddin Nasimi, was laid out on the corner of Nizami and Samad Vurgun Streets. In 1978, on the eve of celebration of the 600th anniversary of the poet, a monument to the poet was installed in the center of the park, a sculpture of which was made of bronze and installed on a granite pedestal. In 2008, a reconstruction of the park began.

Architecture
The architecture of the street reflects a synthesis of various styles and directions, which is because, the intensive construction and building was realized in three main levels: late 19th-early 20th century, 1950s–1970s and a modern period.

Most of the buildings, constructed in the first level, were constructed in “neo-renaissance”, “neo-gothic”, “baroque” and “neoclassicism” styles as other buildings of the city constructed in that period. “Neo-Moorish” style also dominates, in which architects attempted to use elements of national architecture in its construction. Houses are dressed with limestone – aglay. The first level could be divided into three territories of construction: the first – between Vorontsov Street (now Islam Safarli Street) and Persian Street (now M.Muktarov Street), where were located the most ancient buildings constructed by the projects of N.A.von der Nonne and M.Gafar Ismayilov, the second – from a territory, adjoined from Taza Pir Mosque to the South which was a complex of one and two storeyed buildings, the third to the side of railway station, and namely in the third zone, at the turn of the 19th century-beginning of the 20th century, began to be constructed more significant three and four storeyed buildings by the projects of Jozef Ploshko and I.V.Goslavski.

The second level of the architectural development of the street is connected to intrusion of new buildings in the middle of the 20th century, which were implemented in “empire” or so called “Stalin’s empire” style, known today as Stalinist architecture. Later, in the end of 1950s were constructed residential houses, many of which were projected and constructed in a new artistic architectural style which was widely spread in a lot countries of the world and which was known as “constructivism”. According to art critics H.F.Mammadov, architectural style of constructivism was shown fully and manifold almost in Baku in the whole USSR, where it was used for giving the city a new character. Enthusiasm for constructivism in Baku resulted in the creation of a local variety – “constructivism of Baku”. As in earlier constructions, the architects introduced eastern and national tints, which are especially felt in implementation of arches and monograms of the buildings, which significantly changes the total stylistic appearance of these buildings and façade of the building is dressed with aglay.

Modern constructions, especially skyscrapers, are constructed in “neo-modern” style, dressed with alucobond, fiber-reinforced concrete, marble and granite. According to specialists, two buildings, located in this street, are distinguished from other buildings of the street for their style. These are – the building of the Azerbaijan State Theatre of Young Spectators (Nizami 72) which is too massive for the architectural ensemble of this part of the street and doesn't harmonize with a classic style of the architecture by which are represented the nearest houses and it breaks the total geometry of the territory, and the building of the State Committee on Capital Issues (Nizami 87/89), architectural resolution of which is implemented in “constructivism” style and spoils “classical” monumentalism of the street's perimeter.

Historical landmarks

Notes

External links

Streets in Baku
Pedestrian malls
1864 establishments in the Russian Empire